Mabaan is an ethnic group in South Sudan. Most of its members are Muslims. The number of persons in this group is at about 50,000. They speak Mabaan, a Nilotic language. They live in the Upper Nile.

Culture
The Mabaan people are mostly farmers and shepherds. Men and women work together to cultivate crops such as millet, sesame, and beans. The men also engage in hunting and fishing, while women collect fruits and grain.

A 'rain chief' acts as the headman of each village. He possesses both political and religious power. His dwelling is characterized by village drums, heirloom weapons, and other symbolic insignia related to old Mabaan culture.

Related Luo People
The Jumjum people are closely related to the Burun and the Mabaan people.

Ethnic groups in South Sudan